Killbuck Creek is a  tributary of the Kishwaukee River in northern Illinois, United States.

Course
The creek runs north through southeastern Ogle County, where it cuts through Galena limestone and blue limestone. The Killbuck passes through Pine Rock Township, where a stone quarry was once located. In terms of square miles drained, Killbuck Creek is the third largest tributary of the Kishwaukee River behind the South Branch Kishwaukee River and Coon Creek.

References

Tributaries of the Kishwaukee River
Rivers of Ogle County, Illinois